Min Thway (born Nay Min Aung 21 June 1986 – 3 October 2018) was an Arakanese actor and singer. He is best known for his leading roles in several Burmese films. Throughout his career, he had acted in over 200 films.

He started his acting career in 2008.

Early life and education
Min Thway was born on 21 June 1986 in Taw Hthu Village, Manaung, Rakhine State, Myanmar to parents Aung Than and Than Myaing. He was third son of four siblings. His elder brother Nay Toe is also an actor. He attended high school at BEHS Manaung in 2001. He graduated with a degree B.Sc (IC) from Dagon University in 2006.

Death
He died at 33 years old on the way to the hospital on October 3, 2018. He fell unconscious and died shortly after returning to Myanmar from overseas. Doctors did not release his cause of death but people speculate that it resulted from exhaustion or a heart attack.

Filmography

Kyauk Kyauk Kyauk (2017)
Clinging with Hate (2018) (premiered in cinemas after his death)
Killing Field (2018) (premiered in cinemas after his death)
The Dark Cinema (2019)
Responsible Citizen (2019)
Lay Par Kyawt Shein Warazain (2019)

References

External link

1986 births
2018 deaths
Burmese male film actors
21st-century Burmese male singers
21st-century Burmese male actors
People from Rakhine State 
Burmese people of Rakhine descent